Kak Kahzad Castle is a historical castle located in Hamun County in Sistan and Baluchestan Province, The longevity of this fortress dates back to the Parthian Empire and Sasanian Empire.

References 

Castles in Iran
Sasanian castles
Parthian castles